A Little Bit of Heaven is a 1940 musical film starring teenage soprano singer Gloria Jean. The story casts Gloria as a young member of a large Irish working-class family who becomes a singing sensation on a local radio station. The family's new-found wealth causes some discord until the family realizes that their closeness is what they value the most.

The film's title comes from a traditional Irish song that Gloria Jean sings at a family gathering. Her 2005 biography is similarly titled: Gloria Jean: A Little Bit of Heaven. The film is an unofficial sequel to 1939's The Under-Pup, featuring several cast members from that film, but as different characters. The group of girls in The Under-Pup was called "The Penguins", and Gloria Jean sings the group's song early in this film.

Cast
Gloria Jean as Midge Loring
Robert Stack as Bob Terry
Hugh Herbert as Pop Loring
C. Aubrey Smith as Grandpa
Stuart Erwin as Cotton 
Nan Grey as Janet Loring
Eugene Pallette as Herrington
Billy Gilbert as Tony
Kenneth Brown as Tony's son 
Billy Lenhart as Tony's son 
Nana Bryant as Mom Loring 
Tommy Bond as Jerry 
Charles Previn as Radio Conductor 
Kitty O'Neil as Mrs. Mitchell 
Helen Brown as Herrington's secretary

Production
In January 1940 Universal announced that Gloria Jean's third movie would be Our City, the tale of two sisters, based on a story by Grover Jones. Loretta Young was to play the sister and the cast would include Robert Cummings, Eugene Pallette, Lewis Howard and Billy Gilbert.

By May the title had been changed to Straight from the Heart and Young was replaced by Nan Grey. Then it became A Little Bit of Heaven and Cummings was replaced by Robert Stack.  Filming began in June.

References

External links 
 

1940 films
1940 musical films
American black-and-white films
1940s English-language films
Universal Pictures films
Films directed by Andrew Marton
Films produced by Joe Pasternak
American musical films
1940s American films